The 2003 U-18 Junior World Cup was an under-18 international ice hockey tournament held in Břeclav, Czech Republic and Piešťany, Slovakia from August 11–16, 2003.  The United States captured their first gold medal at the tournament, defeating Russia 3–2 in the gold medal game.  The Czech Republic earned the bronze medal with an 8–2 win over Team Canada.

Medal round

Bronze medal game

Gold medal game

Final standings

See also
2003 IIHF World U18 Championships
2003 World Junior Championships

External links
Schedule and Results at HockeyCanada.ca

U-18 Junior World Cup, 2003
Hlinka Gretzky Cup
International ice hockey competitions hosted by Slovakia
International ice hockey competitions hosted by the Czech Republic
Ivan
2003–04 in Slovak ice hockey